Joaquín Fernández Pertusso (born 22 January 1999) is a Uruguayan professional footballer who plays as a defender for Boston River.

Career
A youth academy product of Defensor Sporting, Fernández joined River Plate prior to 2018 Uruguayan Primera División season. He made his professional debut on 12 May 2018 in a 1–0 win against his former club Defensor.

On 6 August 2020, Eredivisie club Heerenveen announced the signing of Fernández on a three-year deal. On 4 March 2021, he joined Montevideo City Torque on a loan deal until 31 December 2021.

On 15 January 2023, Fernández signed with Boston River.

Personal life
Joaquín is the younger brother of Progreso midfielder Fabricio. Fernández also holds an Italian passport.

Career statistics

Club

References

External links
 

1999 births
Living people
Uruguayan footballers
Uruguayan Primera División players
Eredivisie players
Club Atlético River Plate (Montevideo) players
SC Heerenveen players
Montevideo City Torque players
Atenas de San Carlos players
Boston River players
Uruguayan expatriate footballers
Uruguayan expatriate sportspeople in the Netherlands
Expatriate footballers in the Netherlands
Association football defenders